CX 40 Radio Fénix is a Uruguayan Spanish language AM radio station that broadcasts from Montevideo, Uruguay.

It was established in 1939.

Selected programs 
La voz del agro, run by the PERI.

References

External links
 
 1330 AM

Spanish-language radio stations
Radio in Uruguay
Mass media in Montevideo
Radio stations established in 1939
1939 establishments in Uruguay